The Tantalus Range is a subrange of the Pacific Ranges of the Coast Mountains in southern British Columbia, Canada.  The range is easily viewed from the "Sea to Sky Highway" that travels from Vancouver to Squamish and Whistler. To Squamish people, the local indigenous people of the area, the name of the Tantalus Range is Tsewílx’.  

The range's southern end is on the western edge of Squamish and it runs only about 35 km northwest on the west bank of the Squamish River and is less than 16 km wide at its widest.  It is about 460000 ha (4600 km² or 1775 mi²) in area.  Mount Tantalus, is the highest in the range.

The origin of the name, as well as the names of many of its peaks, are from Greek mythology.  Tantalus was doomed in Hades to be half-submerged in cold water with fruit dangling close but not close enough to eat, which is where the word tantalize has its root.  Allegedly the name was conferred by a local mountain climber who was "tantalized" by the sight of the range's impressive spires and icefalls from across the turbulent waters of the Squamish River.  Alternately, another version of the legend has Tantalus and his family frozen before a banquet, unable to move - very descriptive of the ice-draped and somehow regal character of the peaks and icefields of the range. .

The Tantalus Range is a favourite with climbers, and also with photographers and filmmakers.  The best views of it can be had just north of Squamish from the Brohm Ridge and Cheakamus Canyon stretches of BC Highway 99 (the Sea-to-Sky Highway).

Neighbouring ranges:

Garibaldi Ranges
North Shore Mountains
Clendinning Range

(unnamed ranges not listed at present)

See also
Tantalus Provincial Park
Alpha Mountain
Mount Dione
Omega Mountain
Mount Niobe
Ossa Mountain
Pelion Mountain
Mount Pelops
Mount Sedgwick
Serratus Mountain
Mount Thyestes
Lydia Mountain

Gallery

References

Pacific Ranges
Sea-to-Sky Corridor